Elambal is a village in Kollam district of Kerala, India.It is known for its religious unity and festivals and rich heritage. Elambal means Young in Tamil. It lies on the Kollam-Thirumangalam National Highway (NH-744). The nearest town is Punalur. Pincode of Elampal 691322.  Elambal Government UPS under General Education Department of the Government of Kerala offers education from Standard I to VII. Elambal Service Cooperative Bank Limited and Federal Bank,Elampal (Ilambal, as they say) are the major banks in the locality.

Places of worship
The village has two temples: Kottaram Aayiravally Devi Temple and  Elampal Mahadevar Temple, which is one of the very old temples in Kerala. Experts says the temples history dates back to the Sangha era. A new temple is now being constructed at Thiruvazhi. Elampal has churches and mosques also including Jerusalem Mar Thoma Church, Church of God in India (full gospel) in Elampal and Elicode. St. Thomas Mar Thoma Church, Elampal, Mar Gregorios Orthodox Church Marangadu, St. George Orthodox Church, Elampal, St. Thomas Malankara Catholic Church, Thiruvazhy. Church of God.

References 

1.Parankamveettil Family, 129. . Retrieved 23 February 2011

Villages in Kollam district